Chalfonts Community College is a co-educational secondary school in Chalfont St Peter, Buckinghamshire. It takes children from the age of 11 through to 18 and has approximately 1,481 pupils. In August 2011 the school became an Academy.

About
In September 2002 the Department for Education and Skills (DfES) awarded the school specialist school status as a Technology College.  The college was also awarded a second specialism, and also had Training School Status.

In 2008 it was reported that the school was paying sixth form students to teach younger pupils at the school, instead of employing qualified supply teachers whose quality of teaching the school had sometimes felt to be lacking. Twenty-four students were being paid £5 for fifty minutes of teaching a subject, which they were studying at A-level. The students were given training and were accompanied by an adult in the classroom.

Creative and Media Diploma and Engineering Diploma

In 2008, the Chalfonts Community College began to road test the edexcel engineering diploma.

The school was one of two that taught the diploma, and the current year eleven students are still completing the course. The Creative and Media Diploma was successfully launched in September 2009.

Ofsted 
The school was rated "Good" by Ofsted in both November 2013 and May 2017.

References

External links
Official Website
Virtual Learning Environment (VLE)
Department for Education Performance Tables 2019
Ofsted Inspection Report 2007 

Secondary schools in Buckinghamshire
Training schools in England
Academies in Buckinghamshire